The 1969 Kansas City Royals season was the Royals' inaugural season. The team finished fourth in the newly established American League West with a record of 69 wins and 93 losses.

Offseason

A franchise is born 
The club's inception is connected to the Athletics franchise. On October 18, 1967, A.L. owners at last gave Charles O. Finley permission to move the Athletics to Oakland for the 1968 season. According to some reports, Joe Cronin promised Finley that he could move the team after the 1967 season as an incentive to sign the new lease with Municipal Stadium. The move came in spite of approval by voters in Jackson County of a bond issue for a brand new baseball stadium (the eventual Kauffman Stadium) to be completed in 1973. When U.S. Senator Stuart Symington threatened to have baseball's antitrust exemption revoked, the owners responded with a hasty round of expansion. Kansas City was awarded an American League expansion team, the Royals. They were initially slated to begin play in 1971. However, Symington was not willing to have Kansas City wait three years for another team, and renewed his threat to have baseball's antitrust exemption revoked unless the teams began play in 1969. The owners complied, but it forced the Seattle Pilots to enter the league earlier than expected without a suitable stadium, leading to financial difficulty, and a rapid relocation to Milwaukee in April 1970.

The Kansas City franchise was formally awarded to Ewing Kauffman on January 11, 1968. The owner selected Los Angeles Angels vice president Cedric Tallis as the Royals' first general manager, and Tallis began to assemble a front office staff.

Expansion draft 

The 1968 Major League Baseball expansion draft for the Royals and the Seattle Pilots was held on October 15.

Other offseason transactions 
 June 7, 1968: Dane Iorg was drafted by the Royals in the 16th round of the 1968 Major League Baseball Draft, but did not sign.
 August 14, 1968: Galen Cisco was purchased by the Royals from the Boston Red Sox.
 December 12, 1968: Hoyt Wilhelm was traded by the Royals to the California Angels for Ed Kirkpatrick and Dennis Paepke.
 December 15, 1968: Dennis Ribant was purchased by the Royals from the Detroit Tigers.
 March 29, 1969: Dennis Ribant was purchased from the Royals by the St. Louis Cardinals.

1968 MLB June amateur draft and minor league affiliates 
The Royals and Seattle Pilots, along with the two National League expansion teams set to debut in 1969, the Montreal Expos and San Diego Padres, were allowed to participate in the June 1968 MLB first-year player draft, although the new teams were barred from the lottery's first three rounds. Despite this impediment, the Royals drafted fifty players in the 1968 June draft, including Iorg and other future major leaguers Lance Clemons (seventh round), Monty Montgomery (ninth) and Paul Splittorff (25th). Splittorff would win 166 games for the MLB Royals, including seasons of 20 and 19 victories, in a 15-year big-league career, then become a longtime analyst on the team's television crew. 
The Royals affiliated with three minor league clubs during 1968 to develop drafted players; the rosters were filled out by professional and amateur free agents that had been signed and players loaned from other organizations.

1968 farm system

LEAGUE CHAMPIONS: High Point-Thomasville

Regular season 
 May 4, 1969: Bob Oliver became the first Royal to collect six hits in a nine-inning game.

Season standings

Record vs. opponents

Notable transactions 
 April 1, 1969: Steve Whitaker and John Gelnar were traded by the Royals to the Seattle Pilots for Lou Piniella.
 June 5, 1969: 1969 Major League Baseball Draft
Keith Marshall was drafted by the Royals in the 5th round.
Frank Ortenzio was drafted by the Royals in the 47th round.

The first game

Starting lineup

Scorecard 
April 8, Municipal Stadium, Kansas City, Missouri

Roster

Player stats

Batting

Starters by position 
Note: Pos = Position; G = Games played; AB = At bats; H = Hits; Avg. = Batting average; HR = Home runs; RBI = Runs batted in

Other batters 
Note: G = Games played; AB = At bats; H = Hits; Avg. = Batting average; HR = Home runs; RBI = Runs batted in

Pitching

Starting pitchers 
Note: G = Games pitched; IP = Innings pitched; W = Wins; L = Losses; ERA = Earned run average; SO = Strikeouts

Other pitchers 
Note: G = Games pitched; IP = Innings pitched; W = Wins; L = Losses; ERA = Earned run average; SO = Strikeouts

Relief pitchers 
Note: G = Games pitched; W = Wins; L = Losses; SV = Saves; ERA = Earned run average; SO = Strikeouts

Farm system 

LEAGUE CHAMPIONS: Omaha

Elmira affiliation shared with San Diego Padres

Awards and honors 
1969 Major League Baseball All-Star Game
 Ellie Rodríguez (reserve, did not play)
1969 AL Rookie of the Year 
 Lou Piniella

Notes

References 
1969 Kansas City Royals team page at Baseball Reference
1969 Kansas City Royals team page at www.baseball-almanac.com

Kansas City Royals seasons
Kansas City Royals season
Inaugural Major League Baseball seasons by team
Kansas City